T-115 was a minesweeper of the Soviet Navy during World War II and the Cold War. Upon completion she was transferred to the Soviet Union under Lend-Lease as T-115; she was never returned to the United States. The ship was eventually scrapped on 1 June 1966. Because of the Cold War, the U.S. Navy was unaware of this fate and the vessel remained on the American Naval Vessel Register until she was struck on 1 January 1983.

Career 
Apex was laid down on 8 June 1942 at Tampa, Florida, by the Tampa Shipbuilding Co.; launched on 7 December 1942; sponsored by Mrs. J. L. Chancey; and completed on 17 August 1943. She was transferred to the Soviet Navy that same day as T-115. She was never returned to U.S. custody.

In Soviet service she was renamed Aydar on 1 September 1955. She was eventually scrapped on 1 June 1966.

Due to the ongoing Cold War, the U.S. Navy was unaware of this fate. They had reclassified the vessel as MSF-142 on 7 February 1955, and kept her on the American Naval Vessel Register until she was struck on 1 January 1983.

References

External links
 NavSource Online: Mine Warfare Vessel Photo Archive – Apex (MSF 142) – ex-AM-142 – ex-AMc-119

Admirable-class minesweepers
Ships built in Tampa, Florida
1942 ships
World War II minesweepers of the United States
Admirable-class minesweepers of the Soviet Navy
World War II minesweepers of the Soviet Union
Cold War minesweepers of the Soviet Union